Operation Corona was a Royal Air Force (RAF) initiative to confuse German nightfighter defences during RAF bomber raids on German cities during World War II. 

The RAF used both native speakers and people who could speak German to a standard where they could be taken for a native speaker to impersonate German air defence officers. They initiated communications via radio with German night fighter pilots and countermanded previously given orders, thus reducing the efficiency of German air defence.

Operation Corona was made possible because before the war many people, mostly Jews, had fled Nazi Germany and some of them had settled in the United Kingdom. These people were very valuable to RAF Bomber Command, since between them they natively spoke any German accent and hence were capable of countermanding the orders given from the senior German officers in the Air Defence headquarters, and so could redirect the nightfighters to other targets or give them orders to land immediately at an airbase.

The first use of Corona was during a bombing raid on the German industrial centre of Kassel on the night of 22 to 23 October 1943.

In response to Corona the Luftwaffe replaced male fighter controllers with females. The RAF countered this by using German-speaking personnel from the Women's Auxiliary Air Force.

See also
 Aspidistra (transmitter)
 List of World War II electronic warfare equipment

Notes and references

External links
OPERATION CORONA - Claire's story

Conflicts in 1943
World War II aerial operations and battles of the Western European Theatre
History of the Royal Air Force during World War II
Aerial operations and battles of World War II involving the United Kingdom
World War II deception operations